The Nordhessischer Verkehrsverbund (NVV) is a transport association that organises the cooperation of more than 40 North Hessian transport companies, such as supra-regional public transport and regional rail passenger transport. The Verkehrsverbund und Fördergesellschaft Nordhessen mbH is responsible for this.

The network covers an area of approximately 7000 km2 with a network of 7113 km, 84 stations/stops and 5608 stop positions. Bus and train lines, Kassel's tram system, and the Kassel RegioTram light rail system operate in the NVV area. The NVV was established on 13 July 1994 and took effect on 1 May 1995.

Public agency/Supply area
The following local authorities have joined forces to act as sponsors of the NVV:
Kassel urban district
Hersfeld-Rotenburg district
Kassel district
Waldeck-Frankenberg district
Schwalm-Eder-Kreis
Werra-Meißner-Kreis
as well as
the State of Hesse.

Transport companies

Auto Nau GmbH & Co. KG
Bad Wildunger Kraftwagenverkehrs- und Wasserversorgungsgesellschaft mbH
cantus Verkehrsgesellschaft mbH
DB Regio AG (DB Regio Mitte)
Energie Waldeck-Frankenberg GmbH
EOV Frölich
EW Bus
Frölich Bus
Grau Busreisen
Hans Happel Omnibus-Betrieb
Heinrich Sandrock GmbH & Co. Omnibusbetrieb KG
Henze-Reisen
Hessische Landesbahn
Kahlhöfer-Reisen
Karin Spies Haunetal-Reisen
Kasseler Verkehrs-Gesellschaft AG
Konrad Briel Omnibusreisen
DB RegioNetz Verkehrs GmbH – Kurhessenbahn
Omnibusbetrieb Sallwey
OVG – Oberhessische Verkehrsgesellschaft
Pfeil-Reisen
Regionalverkehr Kurhessen GmbH
Reisedienst Bonte GmbH
Wilhelm Grebe Reisedienst
RegioBus Uhlendorff
Regionalbahn Kassel GmbH
RegioTram Betriebsgesellschaft mbH
Reinhold Leuchter Linien- und Verkehrsbetrieb
Stadtwerke Witzenhausen GmbH
Taxi Schmidt
Trümner-Reisen
ÜWAG Bus GmbH
Verkehrsgesellschaft Mittelhessen mbH

References

External links
 

Transport associations in Germany
Transport in Hesse
Companies based in Kassel
1994 establishments in Germany
Transport companies established in 1994